The Aberdare Urban District Council was established in 1894 and covered the parish of Aberdare. Its responsibilities included public health, sanitation, roads and public works generally.

There were five wards, namely Aberaman (also known as No. 5 Ward), Blaengwawr (also known as No. 4 Ward), Gadlys (also known as No. 2 Ward), Llwydcoed (also known as No. 1 Ward), and the Town Ward (also known as No. 3 Ward).  At this time, one member was elected from each ward on an annual basis.

An election was held in April 1902. It was preceded by the 1901 election and followed by the 1903 election. The term of office of members elected at the 1899 election came to an end and those elected were to serve until 1905. There were contested elections in three of the five wards.

(*) denotes sitting member

Results

Aberaman Ward

Blaengwawr Ward

Gadlys Ward

Llwydcoed Ward

Town Ward

References

Bibliography
 
 

1902
1902 Welsh local elections
April 1902 events